A blockship is a ship deliberately sunk to prevent a river, channel, or canal from being used as a waterway.

An early use was in 1667, during the Dutch Raid on the Medway and their attempts to do likewise in the Thames during the Second Anglo-Dutch War, when a number of warships and merchant ships commandeered by the Royal Navy were sunk in those rivers to attempt to stop the attacking forces.

An even earlier use are the six 11th century Skuldelev ships in Roskilde Fjord, sunk to protect Roskilde from northern Vikings. They are now on display in the Viking Ship Museum.

The above is the principal and enduring meaning of 'block ship', but in the mid-19th century the term blockships was applied to two groups of mobile sea batteries developed by the Royal Commission on Coast Defence. The first batch of four was obtained from around 1845 by converting old sailing 74-gun two-deckers, all of them  ships of the line, into floating batteries, equipped with a steam/screw propulsion system. Although these ships were intended for coast defence some of them were used offensively, notably in the Baltic Campaign of 1854 and 1855, where they were an integral part of the British fleet.

The most recent known use of blockships in warfare was during the annexation of Crimea by the Russian Federation. On 6 March 2014, the Russian Navy towed and scuttled the decommissioned cruiser  at the entrance to Donuzlav Bay in western Crimea, to prevent remaining Ukrainian navy vessels from leaving port. Less than 24 hours later, on 7 March, another blockship, the former Black Sea Fleet rescue/diving support vessel BM-416 was scuttled near Ochakov.


See also
 Stone fleet
 Mulberry harbour
 Hulk (ship type)
 Guard ship

Notes

Further reading 
 Brown, D.K. (1983). A Century of Naval Construction: The History of Royal Corps of Naval Constructors 1883-1983. London: Conway Maritime Press. .
 
 Lyon, David and Winfield, Rif (2004). The Sail and Steam Navy List: All the Ships of the Royal Navy 1815-1889. Chatham Publishing. .
 Savitz, S. (2021). "The Suez Grounding Was an Accident, but the Next Blocked Chokepoint Might Not Be," DefenseOne, https://www.defenseone.com/ideas/2021/03/suez-grounding-was-accident-next-blocked-chokepoint-might-not-be/173011/.  
 Savitz, S. (2021). "Blockship Tactics to Trap Enemy Fleets," Proceedings of the U.S. Naval Institute, Vol. 147/12/1426, https://www.usni.org/magazines/proceedings/2021/december/blockship-tactics-trap-enemy-fleets.  
 Sondhaus, L. (2001). Naval warfare, 1815–1914. Warfare and history series. London: Routledge, 
 Winfield, Rif (2009). British Warships in the Age of Sail 1603–1714: Design, Construction, Careers and Fates. Seaforth Publishing. .

External links

Ship types